Nossa Senhora da Luz (Portuguese for Our Lady of Light) is a freguesia (civil parish) of Cape Verde. It covers the eastern part of the municipality of São Domingos, on the island of Santiago.

Subdivisions
The freguesia consists of the following settlements (population at the 2010 census):

Achada Baleia (pop: 376)
Achada Lama (pop: 184)
Baía (pop: 489) 
Cancelo  (pop: 238)
Capela (pop: 170)
Chão de Coqueiro (pop: 256)
Dobe (pop: 196)
Milho Branco (pop: 607)
Moia Moia (pop: 205)
Portal (pop: 135) 
Praia Baixo (pop: 952)
Praia Formosa (pop: 712)
Vale da Custa (pop: 378)

See also
Administrative divisions of Cape Verde

References

São Domingos Municipality, Cape Verde
Parishes of Cape Verde